Llanbadoc is a village and community in the county of Monmouthshire and the preserved county of Gwent in Wales. The population of the village at the 2011 census was 806.

The village is in the Newport postal district of NP15, just across the River Usk from the town of Usk, off the A472. Llanbadoc is within the British House of Commons and Senedd constituencies of Monmouth.

There are not many facilities in this small village - there is a village and parish church, a garage, a saw mill, an open prison and an agricultural college.

Llanbadoc is the birthplace (1823) of Alfred Russel Wallace.

The community includes the villages of Monkswood and Glascoed.

Governance
An electoral ward in the same name exists. This ward stretches north from Llanbadoc to Gwehelog Fawr. The total ward population taken at the 2011 census was 1,299.

References

External links
 Llanbadoc on Genuki

Villages in Monmouthshire
Communities in Monmouthshire
Monmouthshire electoral wards